William George Tyrrell, 1st Baron Tyrrell,  (17 August 1866 – 14 March 1947) was a British civil servant and diplomat. He was Permanent Under-Secretary of State for Foreign Affairs between 1925 and 1928 and British Ambassador to France from 1928 to 1934.

Background and education
Tyrrell, grandson of an Indian princess, was educated in Germany (he spoke fluent German) and at Balliol College, Oxford.

Career
Tyrrell served in the Foreign Office from 1889 to 1928. He was private secretary to the Permanent Under-Secretary of State for Foreign Affairs Thomas Sanderson from 1896 to 1903 and then secretary to the Committee of Imperial Defence from 1903 to 1904 before being appointed as second secretary at the British embassy in Rome. He returned firstly as precis-writer from 1905 to 1907 and later, with Louis Mallet, as private secretary to Sir Edward Grey from 1907 to 1915.

Tyrrell supported the Entente Cordiale with France and did not think a rapprochement with Imperial Germany was possible before 1914. There were secret renewal propose alliances with German Empire.

He appears to have been one of Grey's few intimates but an inherent laziness and frustration with red tape make an assessment of his influence difficult. Certainly however Tyrrell played a more important role than his title might suggest and, for example, in the autumn of 1913 he was sent to Washington as a personal ambassador by Grey to discuss the situation in Mexico following the overthrow of Francisco I. Madero.

In the spring of 1915 Tyrrell appears to have suffered an almost total breakdown (perhaps precipitated by the death of his younger son that year) and he was moved to a less stressful job at the Home Office before being made head of the Political Intelligence Department from 1916 to 1919. He was Permanent Under-Secretary from 1925 to 1928 and British Ambassador to France from 1928 to 1934. As Permanent Under-Secretary he did not think there was a military threat from Japan and that Russia was the enemy and as Ambassador he worked for an Anglo-French agreement. He was also suspicious of Nazi Germany. He was sworn of the Privy Council in 1928 and made a Peer  as Baron Tyrrell of Avon in the County of Southampton, in 1929. In 1935 he was appointed President of the British Board of Film Censors, a post he held until 1947.

Personal life
Lord Tyrrell married Margaret Ann, daughter of David Urquhart, in 1890. He died in March 1947, aged 80, when the barony became extinct as both his sons had been killed in the First World War.

Notes

References
John Ramsden, The Oxford Companion to 20th Century British Politics (Oxford University Press, 2002), pp. 654–55.
L.B. Namier, Avenues of History (London, 1952)
Zara S. Steiner, The Foreign Office and Foreign Policy 1989–1914 (Cambridge, 1969)
F. H. Hinsley (ed.), British Foreign Policy Under Sir Edward Grey (Cambridge, 1977)

External links
 

1866 births
1947 deaths
Members of HM Diplomatic Service
Diplomatic peers
Knights Commander of the Royal Victorian Order
Knights Grand Cross of the Order of the Bath
Knights Grand Cross of the Order of St Michael and St George
Permanent Under-Secretaries of State for Foreign Affairs
Ambassadors of the United Kingdom to France
Civil servants in the Home Office
Private secretaries in the British Civil Service
Barons in the Peerage of the United Kingdom
Members of the Privy Council of the United Kingdom
Principal Private Secretaries to the Secretary of State for Foreign and Commonwealth Affairs
Barons created by George V
People of the British Council
20th-century British diplomats
Wakefield family